= Jean de Courbes =

Jean de Courbes (1592 – 1641), or Juan de Courbes, was a French engraver who was active in Spain.

== Gallery ==
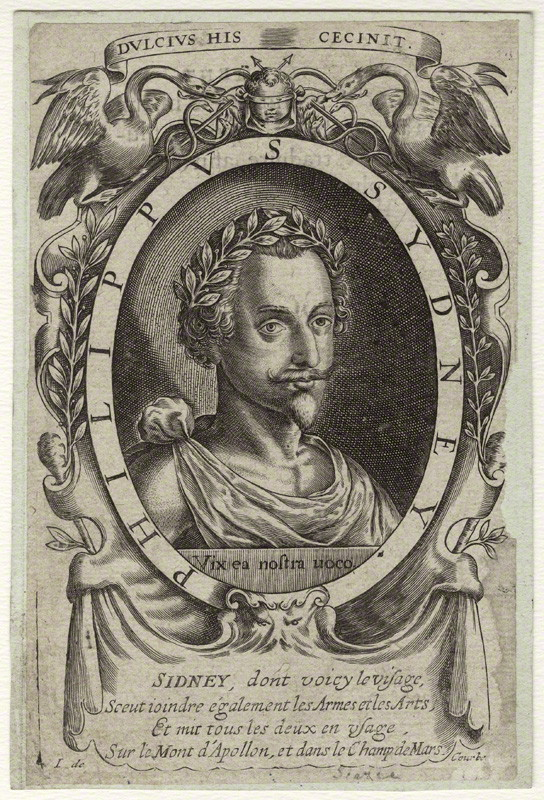

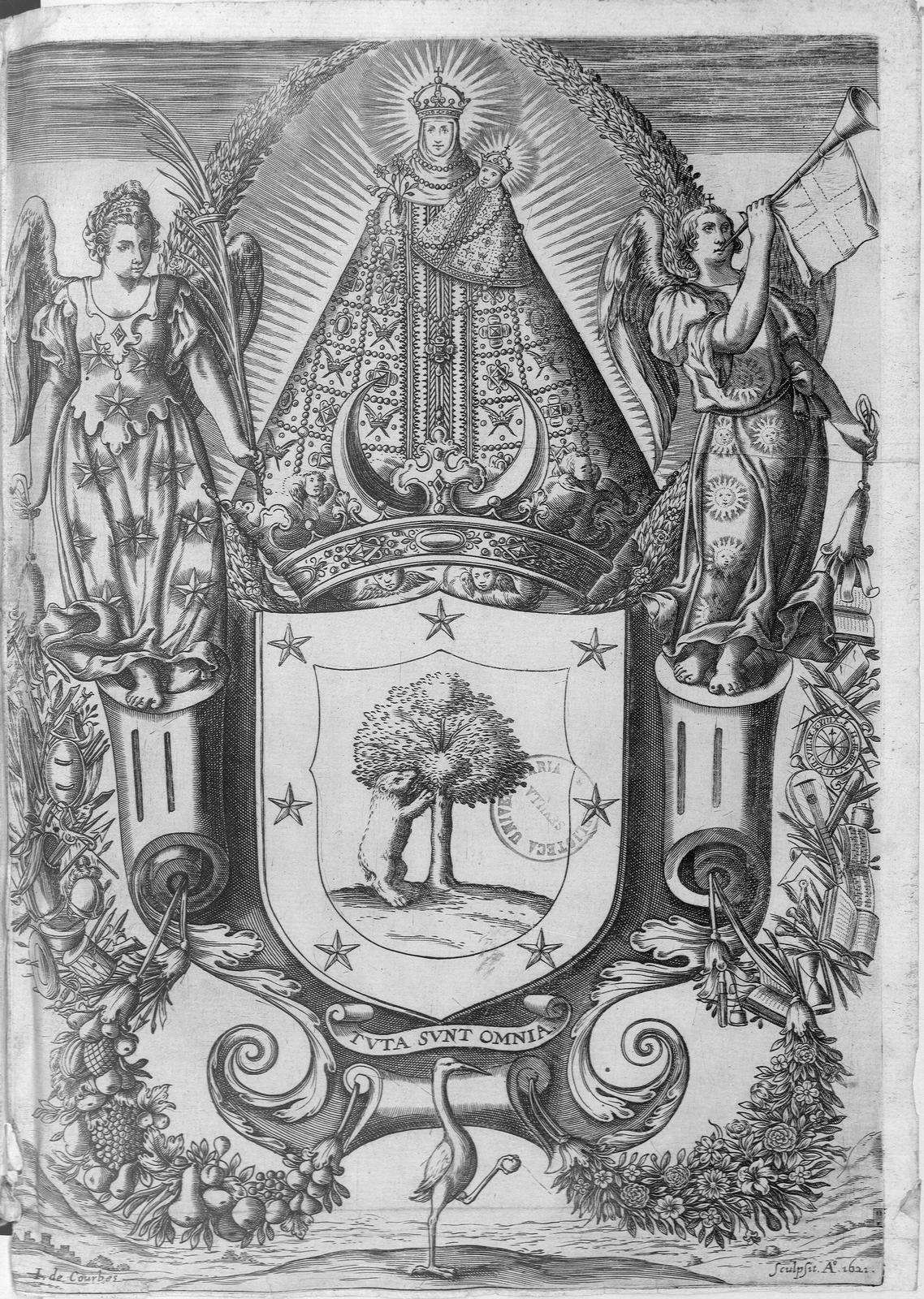

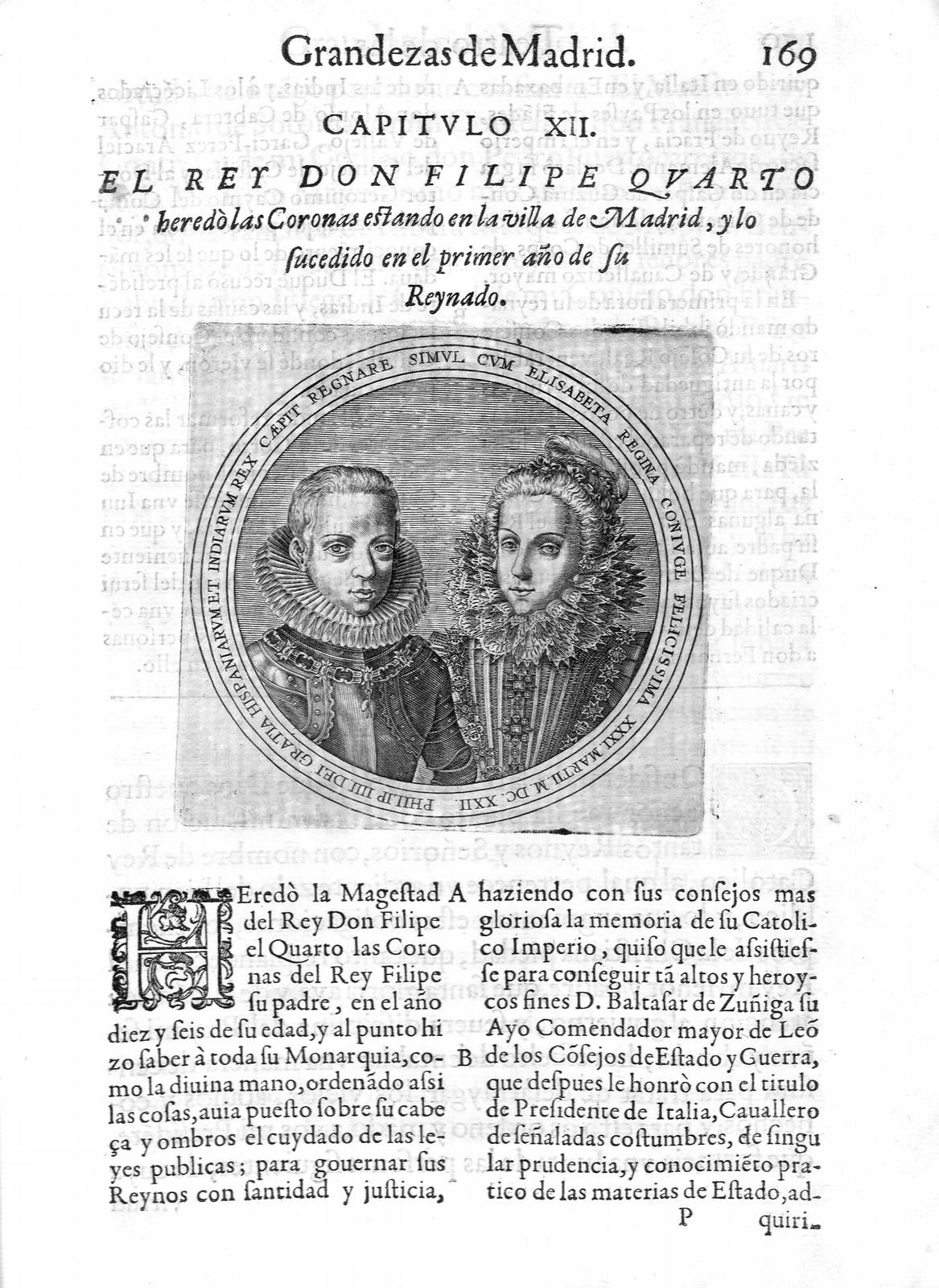

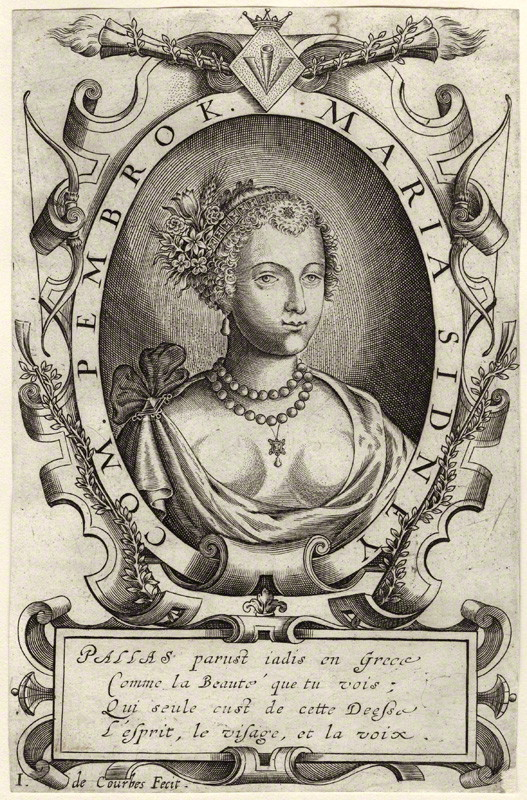

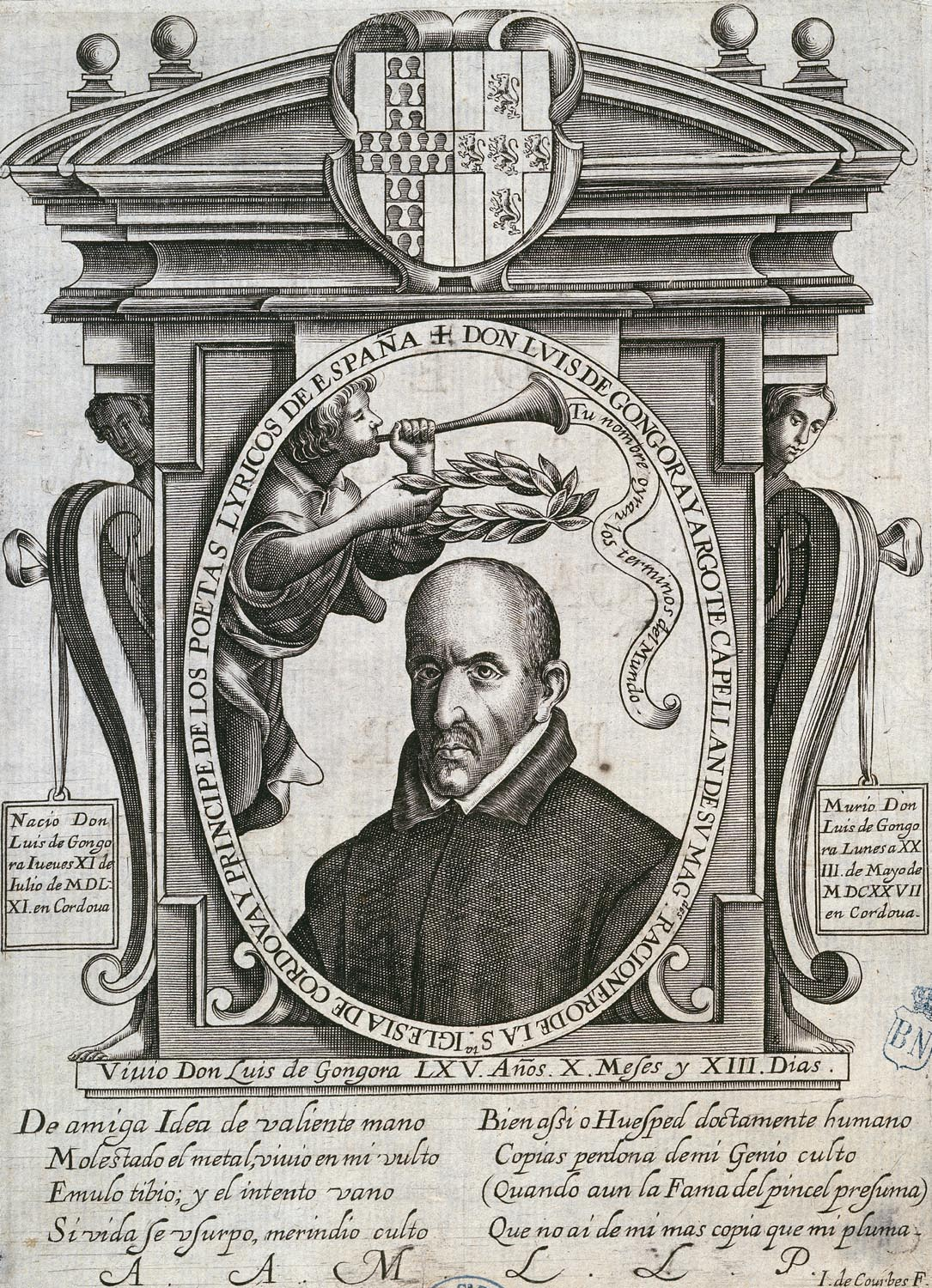
